The 1995 UCI Track Cycling World Championships were the World Championship for track cycling. They took place in Bogotá, Colombia from September 26 to 30. Twelve events were contested, eight for the men and four for the women at the Velódromo Luis Carlos Galán. There were three events held at the championships for the first time: men's team sprint (women's team sprint followed in 2007), men's madison and women's 500 m time trial. They replaced the men's tandem and men's stayers events.

Medal table

Medal summary

 
Uci Track Cycling World Championships, 1995
Track cycling
UCI Track Cycling World Championships by year
International cycle races hosted by Colombia
September 1995 sports events in South America